Frisch's law of photography states that: Any photographer/cinematographer will inherently seek out the format with the least apparent depth of field as their preferred choice.

Background 

In digital photography and cinematography (where there are no film cost implications to increasing the size of the image sensor format) each subsequent format that replaced a previous one has had an increase in size of the sensor, and because of this, less inherent depth of field.

It is named after Swedish cinematographer Adam Frisch, FSF.

References

Links
http://www.cinematography.com/index.php?showtopic=75036
https://www.digitaltrends.com/photography/image-sensor-size-matters/

Photographic techniques
Cinematography